Robert Harold Porter (14 August 1933 – 10 September 2018) was a Canadian businessman, farmer and politician who was a lifelong member of Progressive Conservative party and member of the House of Commons.

He represented the Alberta riding of Medicine Hat where he was first elected in the 1984 federal election and re-elected in 1988, therefore becoming a member in the 33rd and 34th Canadian Parliaments.

Porter left federal politics in 1993 and did not campaign for a third term in Parliament. He died in September 2018 at the age of 85.

He is the grandfather of Canadian Idol star Kalan Porter and actress and musician MacKenzie Porter.

References

 

1933 births
2018 deaths
Members of the House of Commons of Canada from Alberta
People from Medicine Hat
Progressive Conservative Party of Canada MPs